The Girl and the Crocodile is a 1956 Soviet comedy film directed by Iosif Gindin and Isaak Menaker.

Plot 
A young naturalist Mitya gives animals to a girl named Katya, who loves them very much, but does not know how to take care of them.

Cast
 Elena Granovskaya		
 Evgeniy Teterin	
 Natalya Polinkovskaya	
 Natalya Zabavnaya	
 Zoya Fyodorova
 Leonid Lvov
 Lyudmila Makarova
 Pyotr Repnin
 Yelizaveta Uvarova
 Svetlana Mazovetskaya
 Richard Lojko
 Tamara Sukova
 Yuri Bublikov
 N. Yanet
 Natalya Seleznyova

References

External links 
 

1956 films
Soviet comedy films
1956 comedy films
Soviet black-and-white films
1950s Russian-language films